Jind district is one of the 22 districts of Haryana state in northern India. Jind town is the administrative headquarters of the district. It is part of Hisar Division and was created in 1966.

During the Sikh Empire, Jind lies in the heart of Haryana and is the fourth district of the Jat belt along with Sonipat, Rohtak and Hissar.

Etymology
The district derives its name from its headquarters town Jind that is said to be derived from Jaintapuri. It is also said that this town had been founded at the time of the Mahabharata. According to a legend, the Pandavas built a temple in honour of Jainti Devi (the goddess of victory), offered prayers for success, and then launched the battle with the Kauravas. The town grew up around the temple and was named Jaintapuri (Abode of Jainti Devi) which later on came to be known as Jind.

History

Jind Fort
Raja Gajpat Singh, a great-grandson of Phul, the founder of the Phulkian Misl, established an independent kingdom by seizing a large tract of the country, which included the territory occupied by the present district of Jind, from the Afghan governor Zain Khan in 1763 and created Jind city, the capital of the state in 1776. He built a fort here in 1775. Later, Sangrur was chosen as the capital of Jind State by Raja Sangat Singh (reigned 1822 to 1834).

The Raja of Jind is of the same family as the Maharaja of Patiala, being like him, descended from Phul.

The Originator of the Phulkian Dynasty, Phul left six sons, of whom Tiloka was the eldest, and from him are descended the families of Jind and Nabha.

From Rama, the second son, sprang the greatest of the Phulkian houses, that of Patiala besides Bhadaur, Kot Duna and Malaudh.

In 1627 Phul founded and gave his name to a village which was an important town in the State of Nabha. His two elder sons founded Bhai Rupa while Rama also built Rampura Phul.

Punjab history reveals that Jind was founded by descendants of Phool. Jind was a native state in Haryana. Jind was a state of Siddus founded by the grandson of Chaudhary Phul Singh.

Claiming descent from Jaisal, founder of the State of Jaisalmer in 1156, the founder of this Sikh dynasty, Phul, was Chaudhary (Governor) of a country located at the southeast of Dihli. Phul's descendants founded 3 States: Patiala, Jind, and Nabha.

Tiloka had two sons namely, 1. Gurudutta 2. Sukh Chain. Sukh Chain's descendants ruled Jind state and Gurudatta's descendants ruled Nabha state.

Post-Independence after 1947
After independence, Jind State was merged with the Indian union and the territory of the present district became part of Sangrur district of Patiala and East Punjab States Union on 15 July 1948. At the time of its creation of Haryana state on 1 November 1966, Sangrur district was bifurcated and its Jind and Narwana tehsils were merged to form Jind district, one of the seven districts of the newly formed state. Jind tehsil was bifurcated to two tehsils: Jind and Safidon in 1966.

Divisions
The district comprises three sub-divisions: Jind, Narwana and Safidon. Jind sub-division is further divided into three tehsils: Jind, Julana and Alewa (sub-tehsil). Narwana sub-division is further divided into two tehsils: Narwana and Uchana (sub-tehsil), and Safidon sub-division is also divided into two tehsils: Safidon and Pillu-Khera (sub-tehsil).

There are five Vidhan Sabha constituencies in this district: Jind, Julana, Safidon, Uchana Kalan and Narwana. Jind, Julana and Safidon are part of Sonipat Lok Sabha constituency. Narwana and Uchana Kalan are part of Sirsa and Hisar Lok Sabha constituencies respectively.

Jind town, the administrative headquarters, has an Arjun stadium, milk plant, cattle feed plant, and a large grain market. There are facilities for stay at PWD rest house, canal rest house, and market committee rest house. The town is well provided with schools, colleges, hospitals, and other basic amenities. Jind is noted for its numerous temples sacred to the worship of Shiva. Tradition assigns the settlement of the town to the Mahabharat period. Rani Talab is the major tourist attraction and Pandu-Pidara and Ramrai are the main devotional places attracting devotees for Amaavas bath.

Demographics

According to the 2011 census Jind district has a population of 1,334,152, roughly equal to the nation of Mauritius or the US state of Maine. This gives it a ranking of 364th in India (out of a total of 640). Its population growth rate over the decade 2001-2011 was 11.95%. Jind has a sex ratio of  870 females for every 1000 males, and a literacy rate of 72.7%. Scheduled Castes make up 21.16% of the population.

Languages 

At the time of the 2011 Census of India, 84.07% of the population in the district spoke Haryanvi, 12.41% Hindi and 2.80% Punjabi as their first language.

See also 

 Haryana Tourism
 List of Monuments of National Importance in Haryana
 List of State Protected Monuments in Haryana
 List of Indus Valley Civilization sites in Haryana
 List of National Parks & Wildlife Sanctuaries of Haryana, India
 Nachar Khera

References

External links
Official website
Jind Directroy

 
Forts in Haryana
Districts of Haryana
1966 establishments in Haryana